Breme (Lombard: Bräm) is a comune (municipality) in the Province of Pavia in the Italian region Lombardy, located about  southwest of Milan and about  west of Pavia.

Breme borders the following municipalities: Candia Lomellina, Frassineto Po, Sartirana Lomellina, Valle Lomellina, Valmacca.

Demographic evolution

References

External links
 www.comunebreme.it/

Cities and towns in Lombardy